VoloMetrix, Inc. is an American subsidiary of Microsoft based in Seattle, Washington. VoloMetrix sells people analytics software that combines data from collaboration platforms to create data visualizations and dashboards. At the end of April 2013, the company raised $3.3M in series A funding from Shasta Ventures. In October 2014, VoloMetrix announced a series B funding round with Shasta Ventures and Split Rock Partners that raised $12M. In September 2015, Microsoft announced that they had acquired the company, but did not disclose the amount. The acquisition was made to improve existing Microsoft offerings such as Microsoft Office 365 and Microsoft Delve.

Company team 
The company was founded in 2011 by Ryan Fuller, the company's CEO, and Chris Brahm, a senior partner and director at Bain & Company. The VoloMetrix leadership team includes Natalie McCullough (Chief Revenue Officer), Nimrod Vered (VP of Engineering), Chantrelle Nielsen (VP of Product), Ahmed Quadri (VP of Customer Solutions), Eileen Conway (VP of Marketing), and Peter Cullen (Chief Privacy Officer). Jim Simons, Managing Director of Split Rock Partners, joined the VoloMetrix Board of Directors following the series B funding round.

Technology 
VoloMetrix extracts and analyzes anonymous data from company email, calendar, social platforms, and line-of-business applications.

Patent 
In August 2014, VoloMetrix publicly announced that it had filed a patent for its proprietary technology and associated metrics. VoloMetrix's key organizational metrics include Organizational Load Index (OLI), Fragmentation, Network Efficiency Index, and other measures aimed at improving employee performance.

Metrics 
Metrics provided by VoloMetrix include:

Organizational Load Index: number of hours a person consumes from the rest of the organization based on meetings they organize and emails they send
1:1 Manager Interactions: number of hours per week spent in meetings involving only an individual and the individual's direct supervisor during a given time period
Time in Meetings: number of hours per week spent in meetings during a given time period

References

External links

Big data companies
Data management software
Enterprise software
Business software
Microsoft acquisitions
Microsoft subsidiaries